In enzymology, an alcohol O-cinnamoyltransferase is an enzyme that catalyzes the chemical reaction

1-O-trans-cinnamoyl-beta-D-glucopyranose + ROH  alkyl cinnamate + glucose

Thus, the two substrates of this enzyme are 1-O-trans-cinnamoyl-beta-D-glucopyranose and an alkanol (ROH), whereas its two products are alkyl cinnamate and glucose.

This enzyme belongs to the family of transferases, specifically those acyltransferases transferring groups other than aminoacyl groups.  The systematic name of this enzyme class is 1-O-trans-cinnamoyl-beta-D-glucopyranose:alcohol O-cinnamoyltransferase.

References

 
 

EC 2.3.1
Enzymes of unknown structure